Saint-Vougay is a commune in the Finistère department of Brittany in north-western France.

Population
Inhabitants of Saint-Vougay are called in French Saint-Vougaisiens.

See also
Communes of the Finistère department
Yann Larhantec Sculptor

References

External links

Mayors of Finistère Association 

Communes of Finistère